Martin Veyron (born 27 March 1950 in Dax, Landes, France) is a French comic book author and novelist, best known for his graphic novels and editorial cartoons. His style combines disenchanted vaudeville and scathing studies of mores in the manner of Gérard Lauzier.

Career 

Veyron graduated from the Collège Stanislas de Paris. In 1975, he founded the Imaginon studio with Jean-Claude Denis and Caroline Dillard. He published his first illustrations in Lui, L'Expansion, and Cosmopolitan.

His first comics date from 1977, when he wrote Edmond le cochon (drawn by Jean-Marc Rochette) for L'Écho des savanes. He wrote Raoul et Remy for Pilote in 1978 and Olivier Désmoreaux (under the pseudonym Richard de Muzillac) in 1984. His works were published by Éditions du Fromage at Casterman and Éditions Albin Michel. Many of his cartoons were published in newspapers such as Libération, Paris Match, L'Obs, and L'Événement du jeudi.

In 1985 he made a film from his graphic novel L'Amour propre. He published his first novel, Tremolo Corazon, in 1996.

Veyron received the Grand Prix of Angoulême International Comics Festival in 2001 and presided the jury in 2002.

Personal life 
He is married to Anne Chabrol, a former reporter from the war in Northern Ireland and a former director of magazines Elle, Glamour and  Cosmopolitan. He has two sons.

Works

Comics 
 Oncle Ernest, with  Jean-Claude Denis, Casterman, 1978
 Bernard Lermite
 Bernard Lermite Éditions du Fromage, 1979
 Plus lourd que l'air, Éditions du Fromage, 1979
 Personnellement je ne veux pas d'enfants (mais les miens feront ce qu'ils voudront), Éditions du Fromage, 1980
 L'éternel féminin dure, Éditions du Fromage, 1981
 Ce n'est plus le peuple qui gronde mais le public qui réagit (Dargaud, 1982
 Peut-on fumer après la mort ?, Albin Michel, 1988
 Le pagure est connu, Albin Michel, 1993
 Edmond le cochon, scénario de Martin Veyron, dessin de Jean-Marc Rochette
 Edmond le cochon, Éditions du Fromage, 1980
 Edmond le cochon va en Afrique, Éditions du Fromage, 1981
 Le continent mystérieux, Albin Michel, 1983
 Le mystère continental, Albin Michel, 1993
 L'Amour propre (ne le reste jamais très longtemps), Albin Michel, 1983
 Zodiaque, collective album with Arno, Caro, Caza, Yves Chaland/Doug Headline, Cheraqui, Luc Cornillon, Michel Crespin, Dodo/Ben Radis, Jean-Claude Gal, Paul Gillon, Dominique Hé, Kent Hutchinson, Chantal Montellier, Hugo Pratt, Martin Veyron, Al Voss/Angelfred, coll. « Pied jaloux », Les Humanoïdes Associés, 1983)
 Olivier Désormeaux – Âge ?... Moyen !, written by Martin Veyron, drawn by Diego de Soria, Dargaud, 1984
 Executive Woman, Albin Michel, 1986
 Bêtes, sales et mal élevés, Futuropolis, 1987
 Donc, Jean..., Albin Michel, 1990
 Jivara, Albin Michel, 1992
 Cru bourgeois, Albin Michel, 1998
 Caca rente, Albin Michel, 2000
 Trois d'entre elles, Albin Michel, 2004
 Cour Royale, with Jean-Marc Rochette, 2005
 Papy Plouf, Albin Michel, 2006
 Blessure d'amour propre, Dargaud, 2009
 Ce qu'il faut de terre à l'homme, Dargaud, 2016 - Official selected Angoulême International Comics Festival in 2017

Drawing works 
 Un nègre blanc le cul entre deux chaises, Futuropolis, 1980
 Vite !, Albin Michel, 1988
 Politiquement incorrect, Hoëbeke, 1995
 (sic), Albin Michel, 2001

Published art albums 
 La fin du chèque (Crédit Agricole, 1983)
 Le cahier (Clairefontaine, 1987)
 Titre ? de transport (Semvat, 1992)

Film 
 L'Amour propre ne le reste jamais très longtemps (1985)

Further reading 
 Guillaume Laborie, « Cru bourgeois », dans L'Indispensable no 3, janvier 1999, p. 78-79.
 Benoît Mouchart, Martin Veyron, faiseur d’histoires, Angoulême : Musée de la bande dessinée, 1979.

References

External links 
 Audio interview with Martin Veyron at Blessure d'amour-propre

1950 births
Living people
Grand Prix de la ville d'Angoulême winners
French cartoonists
French comics writers
Collège Stanislas de Paris alumni
École nationale supérieure des arts décoratifs alumni
Writers from Paris
People from Dax, Landes